Hanousek v. United States, 176 F.3d 1116 (9th Cir. 1999), was a decision by the United States Court of Appeals for the Ninth Circuit, which held that ordinary negligence was the legal standard for criminal negligence under the Clean Water Act.

In 1994, during rock removal operations, a backhoe operator accidentally struck a petroleum pipeline near the railroad tracks. Despite not being present at the scene during operations White Pass and Yukon Route Roadmaster Edward Hanousek, Jr. and President Paul Taylor were both held responsible for the spill and convicted.

The Supreme Court of the United States denied review of the Ninth Circuit's decision, provoking a dissent from two justices.

Background of the case
Hanousek was employed by the Pacific & Arctic Railway and Navigation Company as roadmaster of the White Pass and Yukon Railroad, which runs between Skagway, Alaska, and Whitehorse, Yukon Territory, Canada. As roadmaster, Hanousek was responsible under his contract "for every detail of the safe and efficient maintenance and construction of track, structures, and marine facilities of the entire railroad…and [was to] assume similar duties with special projects."

The project was designed to realign a sharp curve in the railroad and to obtain armor rock for a ship dock in Skagway. The project involved blasting rock out-croppings alongside the railroad, working the fractured rock toward railroad cars, and loading the rock onto railroad cars with a backhoe. Pacific & Arctic hired Hunz & Hunz, a contracting company, to provide the equipment and labor for the project.

At 6-mile, a high-pressure petroleum products pipeline owned by Pacific & Arctic's sister company, Pacific & Arctic Pipeline, Inc., runs parallel to the railroad at or above ground level, within a few feet of the tracks. To protect the pipeline during the project, a work platform of sand and gravel was constructed, a platform on which the backhoe operated to load rocks over the pipeline and into railroad cars. The location of the work platform changed as the location of the work progressed along the railroad tracks. In addition, when work initially began in April, 1994, Hunz & Hunz covered an approximately  section of the pipeline with railroad ties, sand, and ballast material to protect the pipeline, as was customary.

After Hanousek took over responsibility for the project in May, 1994, no further sections of the pipeline along the  worksite were protected, with the exception of the movable backhoe work platform. On the evening of October 1, 1994, Shane Thoe, a Hunz & Hunz backhoe operator, used the backhoe on the work platform to load a train with rocks. After the train departed, Thoe noticed that some fallen rocks had caught the plow of the train as it departed and were located just off the tracks in the vicinity of the unprotected pipeline. At this location, the site had been graded to finish grade and the pipeline was covered with just a few inches of soil. While using the back-hoe bucket to sweep the rocks from the tracks, Thoe struck the pipeline causing a rupture. The pipeline was carrying heating oil, and an estimated  of oil were discharged over the course of many days into the adjacent Skagway River.

Prosecution and Court of Appeals decision
Following a United States Coast Guard investigation, Hanousek was charged with one count of negligently discharging a harmful quantity of oil into a navigable water of the United States, in violation of the Clean Water Act. Hanousek and Pacific & Arctic President Paul Taylor were also charged with providing false information to the officials who investigated the accident.

Hanousek was convicted of negligently discharging a harmful quantity of oil into a navigable water, but was acquitted on providing false information. The district court imposed a sentence of six months of imprisonment, six months in a halfway house and six months of supervised release, as well as a fine of $5,000.

In a three judge unanimous opinion written by Judge David R. Thompson the U.S. 9th Circuit Court of Appeals upheld Hanousek's conviction.

Subsequent proceedings
The Supreme Court of the United States denied Hanousek's petition for a writ of certiorari. Justice Clarence Thomas, joined by Justice Sandra Day O'Connor, dissented from the Court's order.

References

External links

1994 in Alaska
1999 in the environment
1999 in United States case law
Municipality of Skagway Borough, Alaska
United States Court of Appeals for the Ninth Circuit cases
United States environmental case law
Refined oil product pipelines in the United States
Negligence case law
Heating oil